WNCK (89.5 FM) is radio station known as "89.5 Quahog Country".

It is licensed to and serves Nantucket, Massachusetts. The station is owned by Nantucket Public Radio, Inc.

The station signed on in 2002 and originally programmed an adult contemporary format. On April 1, 2003, the station entered into a ten-year programming and operational agreement with the WGBH Educational Foundation; despite this, WNCK remained separately-run from WCAI, WNAN, and WZAI, the WGBH-owned and operated Cape and Islands NPR stations.

Originally, WGBH programmed WNCK as a simulcast of its primary radio service, offering a mixed-format of classical, jazz, folk, blues, Celtic music, and news. Upon the completion of WGBH's acquisition of Boston classical music station WCRB on December 1, 2009, WNCK switched its programming source to that station in an effort to improve WCRB's signal. (Concurrent with the acquisition, WGBH's own classical music programming, as well as the folk and blues programming, were replaced with increased news programming, essentially rendering the simulcast on WNCK largely redundant to WCAI, specifically the WNAN transmitter.)

On June 19, 2014, WNCK dropped its simulcast with WCRB and added the NPR programs Morning Edition and All Things Considered while airing classical music the rest of the day and all weekend.

On December 28, 2020, the station changed its format to country music, branded as "89.5 Quahog Country".

References

External links

NCK
NPR member stations
Public Radio International stations
Country radio stations in the United States
Nantucket, Massachusetts
WGBH Educational Foundation
Radio stations established in 2002
2002 establishments in Massachusetts